The Rajasthan Legislative Assembly is the unicameral state legislature of Rajasthan state in India.

The seat of the Legislative Assembly is at Jaipur, the capital of the state. The term of the Legislative Assembly is five years, unless dissolved earlier. Presently, it comprises 200 members who are directly elected from single-seat constituencies.

List of constituencies
Following is the list of constituencies of the  Rajasthan Vidhan Sabha since the delimitation of legislative assembly constituencies in 2008. At present, 34 constituencies are reserved for candidates belonging to the Scheduled castes and 25 are reserved for the candidates belonging to the Scheduled tribes:

References

Constituencies of Rajasthan Assembly

Rajasthan Assembly